Geoffrey Mervyn Ayling AM (born 9 November 1939) is an Australian sport shooter, specialising in the rifle.

He has competed in the Commonwealth Games, representing Australia at Edmonton 1978 and Brisbane 1982, and winning a gold medal.

References

1939 births
Living people
Australian male sport shooters
Shooters at the 1978 Commonwealth Games
Shooters at the 1982 Commonwealth Games
Commonwealth Games gold medallists for Australia
Commonwealth Games medallists in shooting
20th-century Australian people
Medallists at the 1982 Commonwealth Games